Steven Brunk is an American politician who was a Republican member of the Kansas House of Representatives. He represented the 85th district in the State of Kansas from 2003 to 2015. In 2018 he was rated 100% by the American Conservative Union.

Committee membership
 Commerce and Labor (Chair)
 Federal and State Affairs
 Elections
 Insurance
 Joint Committee on State Building Construction

Major donors
The top 5 donors to Brunk's 2008 campaign were all professional organizations:
1. Kansas Assoc of Realtors 	$1,000
2. Koch Industries 	$1,000 	
3. Kansas Contractors Assoc 	$1,000
4. Kansas Medical Society 	$1,000
5. Kansas Optometric Assoc 	$750

References

External links
 Official website
 Kansas Legislature - Steven Brunk
 Project Vote Smart profile
 Kansas Votes profile
 State Surge - Legislative and voting track record
 Campaign contributions: 2006, 2008

Republican Party members of the Kansas House of Representatives
Living people
Conservatism in the United States
1951 births
21st-century American politicians